Swilling Butte is a -elevation ridgeline summit located in the eastern Grand Canyon, in Coconino County of northern Arizona, United States. The landform is in a group of nearby summits, Colter Butte, west, and Hutton and Duppa Buttes, east. All four buttes are at the north of the east-flowing Kwagunt Creek and Canyon drainage to the Colorado River. Swilling Butte is a triangular-platform summit of bright-red, tall Redwall Limestone. Being a cliff-former, the Redwall is also a platform-former. The upper platform of the Redwall Limestone supports a remainder-debris of the Supai Group (a 4-unit group). Of the two lower units, no. 2 is a cliff-former, hard rocks (cliffs), of the Manakacha Formation; the slope-former, (unit no. 1), the Watahomigi Formation, forms most of the Supai debris upon the Redwall. Below the Redwall Limestone are members of the Cambrian Tonto Group, the Muav Limestone and the slopes of the Bright Angel Shale.

Citations

External links

Aerial view, Swilling Butte, Mountainzone
Swilling Butte photo by Harvey Butchart

Buttes of Arizona
Colorado Plateau
Grand Canyon, North Rim
Grand Canyon
Grand Canyon National Park
Landforms of Coconino County, Arizona
North American 2000 m summits